Svoradov is a university student campus on Svoradova Street in the Old Town of Bratislava, Slovakia. It was the first modern campus building in Bratislava, first parts being constructed in 1932. Svoradov was an important place for the forming of Slovak Catholic intelligentsia from its inception, until the end of Second World War and its founding fathers included the ultra-conservative Andrej Hlinka and the war criminal Jozef Tiso.

Currently it is operated by the Slovak Technical University; it contains 309 student rooms, 18 guest rooms and a gym. The student rooms contain 1-3 beds (guest rooms 1-2 beds) and they are free to rent for the public from July to August each year.

Svoradov is also the name of a grocery store nearby the campus at Palisády Street No. 2.

History 
After establishing the Comenius University in Bratislava in 1919 the problem of student housing emerged, because the city was essentially lacking a university campus. Priest Eugen Filkorn was tasked to establish a campus, because he already had experience in providing similar services under Austria-Hungary. In 1922, Filkorn made a deal with the Orphanage of Saint Elisabeth, whose building stood at the site of current Svoradov, to house students. The premises soon turned out to be unsuited and wet and the construction of a new campus building was decided. For this reason, the Company of the Collegium of Saint Svorad was established to collect money from the people. The Company was supervising both the construction and later the operation of the campus. Its prominent members included Andrej Hlinka, Jozef Tiso, Ferdiš Juriga and Tomáš Ružička.

During World War II, the campus housed the Higher leadership school of the Hlinka youth and the Academic Hlinka Guard, paramilitary organisations under the clerofascist regime of the Slovak State.

Priest Eugen Filkorn, who was the founder and later director of campus Svoradov was tried after the war and he was sentenced to 2 years in prison in 1947.

Campus regime 
Everybody had to wake up at 7.00 a.m., attend a mass, then breakfast, lectures, lunch break at 12.00 noon, afterwards more lectures, at 6.00 p.m. dinner, then mass and then study until 11.00 p.m. Smoking at the rooms was allowed, but it was forbidden to carry out political actions.

Notable inhabitants 
 Gustáv Husák, future communist President of Czechoslovakia
 Andrej Žarnov, catholic modernist writer and physician
 Karol Sidor, anti-semite politician, future Minister of the Interior of Slovak State
 Ferdinand Ďurčanský, war criminal sentenced to death, future Minister for Home and Foreign Affairs of Slovak State
 Július Stano
 Jozef M. Kirschbaum
 Anton Neuwirth
 Jozef Vicen
 Gustáv Valach, actor
 Fantišek Hrušovský, historian
 Belo Polla, archeologist
 Štefan Hoza, operatic singer
 lawyers: Vojtech Marko, Július Virsiko, Františkek Braxátor
 František Sýkora, medical doctor
 Imrich Kružliak, journalist
 Jozef August Mikuš, diplomat
 Ladislav Záborský, painter
 Severín Zrubec, poet

See also 
 History of Bratislava
 Zochova Street
 Parks and gardens in Bratislava

References

External links 
 Official homepage of the campus, in Slovak
 History and traditions of the campus, in Slovak

Buildings and structures in Bratislava